Gwin Town (also known as Bablobli or Babloh-Bli) is a populated place in the county of Grand Gedeh in Liberia.

References 

Populated places in Liberia
Grand Gedeh County